The James Perry House is a historic house at 121 Perryville Road in Rehoboth, Massachusetts.  This -story cottage was built c. 1860 by James Perry, a wealthy manufacturer, and is one of Rehoboth's finest Italianate houses.  Its center entry is flanked by sidelight windows and pilasters, topped by a narrow entablature.  The eaves are bracketed and modillioned, and there are round-arch windows in the gables.  The land on which it was built belonged to members of the Perry family from 1831, and overlooked a mill operated by the family.

The house was listed on the National Register of Historic Places in 1983.

References

Houses in Bristol County, Massachusetts
Buildings and structures in Rehoboth, Massachusetts
Houses on the National Register of Historic Places in Bristol County, Massachusetts